The 2005 Daytona 500, the 47th running of the event, was held on February 20, 2005 at Daytona International Speedway in Daytona Beach, Florida as the first race of the 2005 NASCAR Nextel Cup season. Dale Jarrett won the pole and Jeff Gordon won the race, making this his third Daytona 500 win. Kurt Busch finished second and Dale Earnhardt Jr. finished third.

Because of that, this was the first Daytona 500 to go longer than 500 miles. It was also the first Daytona 500 to end at sunset, around 6:18 pm EST.

A crowd of 200,000 people were estimated to have attended this race.

Qualifying and Gatorade Duels
The main story focusing on the Gatorade Duels was an accident involving Jimmie Johnson and Kevin Harvick, which turned into a minor feud.

Race summary
The green flag waved with Dale Jarrett leading the field, but he lost the first lap to Jimmie Johnson and fell back through the field after a small bump from behind from defending Daytona 500 champion Dale Earnhardt Jr. Tony Stewart took the lead from Johnson on lap 4 and led 12 laps.

The first caution came out on lap 15 halfway through the first fuel run when Bobby Labonte blew an engine. Scott Wimmer, who had only changed two tires, led when the race restarted.

The second caution flew on lap 28 when Ricky Rudd spun out in the middle of the field, collecting five cars. On lap 36, Matt Kenseth, one of the pre-race favorites in trouble with a smoking exhaust, pitted under green.

On lap 61, there came to the start of green-flag pit stops, with the Dodges coming in first, as they did not get as good fuel mileage as others. Earnhardt Jr. was pushed by Jeff Burton coming into his pit stop, and had to back up to get out after his tires were changed, causing him to drop down through the field. There was a total of seven speeding violations on pit road during these pit stops, most notably Johnson. Once the green flag pit stops cycled through on lap 64, Jeff Gordon had the lead.

Debris on the racetrack brought out the third caution on lap 86, with Gordon still out in front. Stewart led the race at the restart, and he was still leading at halfway and when the fourth caution came out on lap 105 for debris.

On lap 137, there came another round of green-flag pit stops, with Stewart still taking the lead. The fifth caution came out on lap 144 and the sixth one came on lap 155. Waltrip brought out the seventh caution, allowing him to leave the race and led to another round of pit stops on lap 164. Jason Leffler and Kasey Kahne came together on pit road, dropping them both down the field. The wreck on pit road occurred when Kasey Kahne, who was 4th when the pit stops began, was exiting his pit stall, and Leffler was turning into his, unbeknownst to Kahne. Kahne would later rebound before becoming a victim of a couple of crashes not of his own making.

With 32 laps to go, John Andretti, running three-wide and following a group of cars going four-wide, crashed and turned into Leffler, taking that driver out of the race. This would bring up the eight caution, with Stewart still out in front.

Stewart became the first driver since Bobby Allison in 1981 and 1982 to lead the most laps in two consecutive Daytona 500's.

The "Big One" occurred on lap 184. This began when Greg Biffle ran into Scott Riggs, collecting 11 cars in turn 3. Scott Wimmer's car took the worst of it, as his car went onto the apron, flipped over four times, spun on its nose, and crashed hard on its wheels. This crash brought out the ninth caution. Only some cars chose to pit, and Stewart and the others stayed out. Earnhardt Jr., who had languished in midfield for the earlier part of the race, was now up to third place. Kasey Kahne was right in the middle of this crash in his #9 mango colored Dodge Charger, but managed to miss it. Kahne charged again back up through the field when the race went back green.

When the race restarted on lap 187, Andretti drove straight into Mike Skinner, starting a chain reaction crash (another "Big One") involving at least eight cars, bringing out the immediate 10th caution. This crash was the result of someone (possibly Skinner) missing a gear at the restart. Kasey Kahne was also involved in this crash, because as he checked up Dale Jarrett in the 88 accidentally punted him into the infield grass. Kahne spent a lot of time on pit road, but he did not lose a lap, and apparently his car was, or should have been being checked for fender rubs, when the race restarted Kahne made his way from about the 20th position to about the 8th position, but there was clearly still a tire rub on his right front fender; because it was clearly smoking, and FOX commentator Darrel Waltrip even made mention of it, as he made his way back up through the field again.

The race restarted with six laps to go. With five to go, Earnhardt Jr. briefly took the lead, but Stewart retook it on the next lap. The two drivers raced side-by-side until Earnhardt Jr. retook the lead. Gordon took the lead before the 11th caution came out with three laps to go. The caution came out when Kasey Kahne was on the outside moving forward from the 8th position trying keep his momentum up and move into the top 6 or so, as Kurt Busch made a pass on Tony Stewart, who was in the lead; but Jeff Gordon was also fighting on the outside with Stewart for the lead; Kahne slid up the race track hard probably due to a cut tire and as he did so, his teammate Jeremy Mayfield in the 19 car apparently got into the back of him as well and Kahne went into the wall. He could not get off the wall until about the middle of the backstretch, when NASCAR finally brought out the caution. Kahne would end up scored 22nd after being crashed while running 7th and possibly moving up into the top 5 to contend for the win. Oddly as the cars came around for the green flag Kahne's teammate Jeremy Mayfield came down to pit road from running 9th on the track, but apparently returned to the race and would end up finishing a position behind his teammate.

The race restarted on lap 202 with two laps to go. Despite much activity behind him, Gordon was able to hold off Kurt Busch and Earnhardt Jr. to win his third Daytona 500 victory.

This was the third-slowest Daytona 500 to go the distance, with only both the 1960 and 2011 races were slower. Two other runnings of this race in the 2000s were also slower, but they both were rain-shortened.

Results

References

Daytona 500
Daytona 500
NASCAR races at Daytona International Speedway